The Rupert Town Square Historic District in Rupert in Minidoka County, Idaho is a historic district which was listed on the National Register of Historic Places in 2001.

It is centered around the Rupert City Park. It includes a post office, a city hall, a fire station.

References

Historic districts on the National Register of Historic Places in Idaho
Colonial Revival architecture in Idaho
Art Deco architecture in Idaho
Minidoka County, Idaho